Randall Coleman Fowler (born August 4, 1939) is an American inventor, entrepreneur, and investor.

In 1982 Fowler became the founder, chairman, President, and Chief Executive Officer of Identix, Inc. until his retirement in 2001.  Ten years prior to starting the company, Randy began investigating various techniques for reading fingerprints optically.  He worked in the evenings in his garage whereby he created and patented the technology that transformed the biometrics Industry. His patents include electro-optical techniques for fingerprint and analysis forming, the basis for Identix. Randy led Identix through its initial public offering in 1985 and subsequent financings including a number of acquisitions and mergers.  In 1997, the San Jose Business Journal named him as Entrepreneur of the Year.  Additionally, he has been the recipient of the Westergaard Kjakan Award of in 1998, and Professional Awards, and Distinguished Alumnus award, University of Louisville.  He holds a Doctorate of Science of Engineering from Stanford University, a Masters of Science in Engineering from Arizona State University, and a Bachelor of Science from University of Louisville.

References

1939 births
Living people
Businesspeople from Louisville, Kentucky
University of Louisville alumni
Arizona State University alumni
Stanford University School of Engineering alumni
20th-century American inventors